Kotla Vijay Bhaskar Reddy Indoor Stadium is an indoor sporting arena located in Hyderabad in the Indian state of Telangana. It was inaugurated by N. Chandrababu Naidu, then chief minister in 2003 and the capacity of the arena is 2,000 people. It hosted some events for the Afro-Asian Games in 2003.

This stadium is maintained by the Sports Authority of Telangana State (SATS), the state government department that looks after sports affairs.

History 
In November 2007 the stadium opened Hyderabad's biggest roller skating rink, a 100-metre flat track. This rink was built by SATS for skaters trained by Abbas Iqbal Lasania, Andhra Pradesh's first National Roller Skating (Speed) Champion and an International Coach whose students have been representing India at International Skating Competitions, in both roller and ice skating.

The rink was made possible by Lasania's students' parents, Savita Reddy, whose daughter Shraddha Reddy went on to become an Asian Roller Skating Championship medalist in 2010.

Children can come to learn badminton and roller skating in the stadium. Lasania trained hundreds of kids, many of whom represented United Andhra and eventually Telangana at the National Championships.

References

External links

 http://yellowpages.fullhyderabad.com/kotla-vijaybhaskar-reddy-indoor-stadium/yousufguda/telephone-email-address-reviews/sports-coaching-31989-1.html

Indoor arenas in India
Sports venues in Hyderabad, India
Volleyball venues in India
Roller skating rinks
Sports venues completed in 2003
2003 establishments in Andhra Pradesh